Frederick Arthur Lye (1881 – 3 October 1949) was a New Zealand politician of the Liberal Party then of the United Party. The United Party was a continuation of the historical Liberal Party, albeit more conservative.

Early life and family
Born in Tunbridge Wells, Kent, England, Lye was the son of Robert Bevan Lye. The family moved to New Zealand in 1886, arriving in Auckland, where Lye was educated. He left home when he was 19 years old and found work milking cows on a dairy farm near Pukekohe. About five years later, he took up farming on his own account at Otakeho on Taranaki's Waimate Plains. In 1906, Lye married Charlotte Louie Preece from Kaponga, and the couple went on to have 10 children. They remained farming at Otakeho until 1918, when they moved to Pukekura, just south of Cambridge in the Waikato, while retaining their farming interests in Taranaki.

His younger brother, Samuel Charles Gale Lye (1884–1937), was also a dairy farmer and also stood for the Liberals in several elections.

Political career

He represented the Waikato electorate from 1922 to 1925, when he was defeated by Stewart Reid of the Reform Party. He won the seat back in 1928, but was defeated by Robert Coulter of the Labour Party in the 1935 landslide to Labour.

In 1935, he was awarded the King George V Silver Jubilee Medal.

Later life and death
Lye remained living at Pukekura until his death at Waikato Hospital in Hamilton on 3 October 1949. He was survived by his wife and 10 children, and was buried at Hautapu Cemetery.

References

External links
Design plans of dwelling at Otakeho for F. Lye

1881 births
1949 deaths
New Zealand Liberal Party MPs
Reform Party (New Zealand) MPs
United Party (New Zealand) MPs
Unsuccessful candidates in the 1935 New Zealand general election
Unsuccessful candidates in the 1925 New Zealand general election
Members of the New Zealand House of Representatives
New Zealand MPs for North Island electorates
People from Royal Tunbridge Wells
English emigrants to New Zealand
New Zealand farmers
Burials at Hautapu Cemetery